Gallinas may refer to:

In Liberia
Gallinas River, Liberia
Gallinas Territory, Liberia
Gallinas tribe, Liberia

In Mexico
Gallinas River (Mexico), a tributary of Santa Maria River (San Luis Potosi)

In the United States
Gallinas, California, a neighborhood of Novato, California
Las Gallinas Valley, a valley in Marin County, California
Las Gallinas, California, a neighborhood of San Rafael, California
Gallinas Mountains, New Mexico
Gallinas National Forest, New Mexico
Gallinas River (New Mexico), or its tributary Gallinas Creek
Gallinas massacre, an 1861 clash between Apache and Confederate Forces in Confederate Arizona

See also
Gallinas River (disambiguation)